Clarence Christopher Dinehart (April 3, 1877 – June 8, 1910) was an American banker and politician.

Dinehart was born in Chicago, Illinois. He moved with his parents in 1884 to Slayton, Minnesota. Dinehart went to the Slayton Public Schools and the Central High School in Minneapolis, Minnesota. In 1899, Dinehart graduated from University of Minnesota. In 1905, he graduated from the Harvard Law School. He worked for the State Bank of Slayton. Dinehart served as president of the Slayton Village Board as a Republican. Dinehart served as Minnesota State Treasurer from 1907 until his death. Dinehart died at Luther Hospital, in Saint Paul, Minnesota, from complications after undergoing surgery for appendicitis. He was seeking the Republican nomination for the United States House of Representatives from Minnesota.

Notes

1877 births
1910 deaths
Politicians from Chicago
People from Slayton, Minnesota
University of Minnesota alumni
Harvard Law School alumni
Businesspeople from Minnesota
Minnesota Republicans
Mayors of places in Minnesota
State treasurers of Minnesota
19th-century American businesspeople